Loeches is a municipality of the Community of Madrid, Spain.

References 

Municipalities in the Community of Madrid